

Statistical sources
Thailand has 38 commercial airports.

Airports of Thailand PLC (AOT) manages Thailand's six international airports and generates their statistics.
 Suvarnabhumi Airport (BKK)
 Don Mueang International Airport (DMK)
 Chiang Mai International Airport (CNX)
 Phuket International Airport (HKT)
 Hat Yai International Airport (HDY)
 Mae Fah Luang-Chiang Rai International Airport (CEI)

AOT reports statistics based on their fiscal year (FY), 1 October–30 September. AOT's FY2014 is 1 Oct 2013–30 Sep 2014.

Thailand's Department of Airports (DOA) manages 28 regional domestic airports and reports their statistics.
The Royal Thai Navy manages U-Tapao Rayong-Pattaya International Airport. Statistics are reported by the DOA.
Bangkok Airways manages three airports: Samui Airport; Sukhothai Airport; and Trat Airport. Statistics are reported by the DOA.

At a glance

Methodology
 The busiest airports in Thailand are measured according to data posted by AOT and by the DOA.
 A "passenger" is defined as a person who departs, arrives, or transits through any airport inside Thailand at any point during a reporting year. These data show number of departures, arrivals, and connecting passengers for the years indicated for both domestic and international flights arriving on scheduled and non-scheduled services.

 Notes: Capacity refers to current design passenger capacity without taking into consideration any unfinished or planned expansion projects or changes to operational hours.  Despite recent expansions at several airports, a number of them are still operating beyond capacity, further expansions are likely to continue.

References

External links
Airports of Thailand PCL (AOT)
The Civil Aviation Authority of Thailand (CAAT)
Department of Civil Aviation of the Kingdom of Thailand
Department of Airports (DOA)
U-Tapao Rayong-Pattaya International Airport

Airports in Thailand
Thailand
Airports, busiest